Smithsonite, also known as zinc spar, is the mineral form of zinc carbonate (ZnCO3). Historically, smithsonite was identified with hemimorphite before it was realized that they were two different minerals. The two minerals are very similar in appearance and the term calamine has been used for both, leading to some confusion. The distinct mineral smithsonite was named in 1832 by François Sulpice Beudant in honor of English chemist and mineralogist James Smithson (c.1765–1829), who first identified the mineral in 1802.

Smithsonite is a variably colored trigonal mineral which only rarely is found in well formed crystals. The typical habit is as earthy botryoidal masses. It has a Mohs hardness of 4.5 and a specific gravity of 4.4 to 4.5.

Smithsonite occurs as a secondary mineral in the weathering or oxidation zone of zinc-bearing ore deposits. It sometimes occurs as replacement bodies in carbonate rocks and as such may constitute zinc ore. It commonly occurs in association with hemimorphite, willemite, hydrozincite, cerussite, malachite, azurite, aurichalcite and anglesite. It forms two limited solid solution series, with substitution of manganese leading to rhodochrosite, and with iron, leading to siderite. A variety rich in cadmium, which gives it a bright yellow color, is sometimes called turkey fat ore.

Gallery

See also
List of minerals
List of minerals named after people

References

Bibliography
 Tom Hughes, Suzanne Liebetrau, and Gloria Staebler, eds. (2010). Smithsonite: Think Zinc! Denver, CO: Lithographie .
 Ewing, Heather (2007). The Lost World of James Smithson: Science, Revolution, and the Birth of the Smithsonian. London and New York: Bloomsbury

External links
 James Smithson's 1802 Calamine Paper

Carbonate minerals
Zinc minerals
Calcite group
Trigonal minerals
Minerals in space group 167
Minerals described in 1802